This is a list of Rectors of Sofia University from 1 October 1888. Until 1945, the term of the rectors was for each academic year.

The number of rectors is 56 and the number of seats is 74 :

References

 
Sofia University
Rector
Rectors of Sofia University